"Bouncing Off the Walls" is the debut single by the American punk rock band Sugarcult from their 2001 album Start Static.

Music video

The music video for "Bouncing Off the Walls" features clips of the band and scenes from the film Van Wilder with Ryan Reynolds and Tara Reid.

In popular culture

"Bouncing Off the Walls" has appeared in various media. It was played in the background of the series premiere of the television show 24 and January 8, 2006 episode of America's Funniest Home Videos.  Additionally, the song was featured on the soundtracks of the films Van Wilder and American Wedding. It was also featured in the Warren Miller documentary Off the Grid. The song was also featured in the 2002 game Big Air Freestyle.

References

External links

2001 songs
2001 debut singles
Sugarcult songs
Fearless Records singles
Songs written by Tim Pagnotta